Ensiforma aeropaga is a beetle of the family Chrysomelidae. The scientific name of the species was first published in 1956 by Jan Bechyné.

References

Galerucinae
Beetles described in 1956